Charles Max Stein (March 22, 1920 – November 24, 2016) was an American mathematical statistician and professor of statistics at Stanford University. 

He received his Ph.D in 1947 at Columbia University with advisor Abraham Wald. He held faculty positions at Berkeley and the University of Chicago before moving permanently to Stanford in 1953. He is known for Stein's paradox in decision theory, which shows that ordinary least squares estimates can be uniformly improved when many parameters are estimated; for Stein's lemma, giving a formula for the covariance of one random variable with the value of a function of another when the two random variables are jointly normally distributed; and for Stein's method, a way of proving theorems  such as the Central Limit Theorem that does not require the variables to be independent and identically distributed. He was a member of the National Academy of Sciences. He died in November 2016 at the age of 96.

Works
Approximate Computation of Expectations, Institute of Mathematical Statistics, Hayward, CA, 1986.
 A bound for the error in the normal approximation to the distribution of a sum of dependent random variables, Sixth Berkeley Stanford Symposium, pages 583-602.

Interviews

References

 
National University of Singapore Program Honoring Prof. Stein
Photograph of Stein
Another photograph

See also
James–Stein estimator
Stein's lemma
Stein's method
Stein's unbiased risk estimate
Stein's loss
Stein discrepancy

1920 births
2016 deaths
American mathematicians
Columbia University alumni
Members of the United States National Academy of Sciences
Stanford University Department of Statistics faculty
University of California, Berkeley faculty
University of Chicago faculty
Mathematical statisticians